Night Attack is the fifth studio album by Australian band The Angels, it was released in November 1981 through Epic Records. The album peaked at No. 11 on the National albums chart. For the 1982 American release of Night Attack by Epic Records, they used the band name Angel City.

In June 2002, Shock Records issued The Complete Sessions 1980 - 1983. The 4-CD box set included remasters of Dark Room (9 bonus tracks), Night Attack (9 bonus tracks), Watch The Red (5 bonus tracks) and The Blow (2-CD set). In June 2006, Liberation Music re-issued Night Attack from The Complete Sessions 1980 - 1983. The album peaked at number 13 on the ARIA Charts and it also charted at number 14 on the Recorded Music NZ.

Reception

Track listings
All tracks written by John Brewster (as John Brewster-Jones), Rick Brewster (as Richard Brewster-Jones), Doc Neeson (as Bernard Neeson) unless otherwise indicated.

Australian 1981 release
Side one
 "Long Night" – 4:12  
 "Runnin' Wild" – 4:19 
 "Fashion and Fame" – 4:38 
 "City Out of Control" – 5:55

Side two
 "Night Attack" (J. Brewster, R. Brewster, Neeson, Brent Eccles) – 3:31 
 "Nothin' to Win" – 4:14 
 "Living on the Outside" – 4:20 
 "Talk About You" (J. Brewster, R. Brewster, Neeson, Eccles) – 3:29 
 "Storm the Bastille" (J. Brewster, R. Brewster, Neeson, Chris Bailey) – 3:43

Bonus tracks on 2002 Shock Records release'''
 "Casablanca" – 4:18
"Small Talk" – 3:31
"Back on You" – 3:05 
"Chaplin's Drum" – 3:22
"Fashion and Fame" (live) – 4:40
"Talk About You" (live) (J. Brewster, R. Brewster, Neeson, Eccles) – 3:31
"Bad Dream" (live) (J. Brewster, R. Brewster, Neeson, Bailey) – 4:20
"Angel" (live) – 4:46
"Devil's Gate" (live) – 5:51

Personnel
The Angels / Angel City members
Doc Neeson – lead vocals
Rick Brewster – lead guitar, producer, mixing at Cherokee Studios, Los Angeles
John Brewster – rhythm guitar, harmonica, vocals, producer, mixing
Chris Bailey – bass guitar, vocals
Brent Eccles – drums

Production
Ed Thacker – producer, engineer, mixing
Paul Ray – assistant engineer
Greg Calbi – mastering at Sterling Sound, New York
Bob King – photography
J. Brewster, R. Brewster, Peter McIan – producers on bonus tracks

2006 re-issue
Don Bartley, R. Brewster – remastering
David Williams – reissue coordinator, track selector
R. Brewster – compilation
Glenn A. Baker, R. Brewster, Brent Eccles – liner notes

Charts

Certifications

References

1981 albums
1982 albums
The Angels (Australian band) albums
Epic Records albums